Friedrich Radszuweit (15 April 1876 – 15 March 1932) was a German manager, publisher, and author and LGBT activist, who was of major importance to the first homosexual movement.

Early life and career

Radszuweit was born in Königsberg. He moved to Berlin in 1901 and opened a shop for women's clothes. In 1923, Radszuweit, who was gay, became president of the organisation Bund für Menschenrecht E.V. (BfM), which worked for the rights of gay people and for the deletion of Paragraph 175 in Germany. He started his own publishing company and published the monthly magazine Zeitschrift für Menschenrecht from 1923 to 1933. The company also published several LGBT books and homoerotic graphics.

The company also produced the first gramophone record with homosexual themes, including Bubi laß uns Freunde sein by Bruno Balz and Erwin Neuber. Other magazines published include Die Insel, Magazin der Einsamen (1926–1931), and the transvestite magazine Das 3. Geschlecht (five issues: 1930–1932). He also started the lesbian magazine Die Freundin, Wochenschrift für ideale Frauenfreundschaft.

Radszuweit wrote the novels Männer zu verkaufen, Ledige Frauen, Die Symphonie des Eros and Paul Tritzkis Lebensweg. In 1927, he produced a flyer for the members of the Reichstag advocating reform of § 175.

Death
In April 1932, Radszuweit died in Berlin of a heart attack. His businesses were taken over at his death by his lover Martin Butzkow (1900–1933), whom he had adopted to allow him to be his heir.

Works 
 Männer zu verkaufen, Leipzig, Lipsia-Verlag, 1932, 6. edition
 Die Symphonie des Eros, Berlin-Pankow, Kaiser Friedrich-Str. 1, 1925
 Paul Titzkis Lebensweg, Berlin-Pankow, Kaiser-Friedrich-Str. 1, Orplid-publishing, 1924

Further reading 
 Bernd-Ulrich Hergemöller, Mann für Mann, Hamburg
 John Lauritsen and David Thorstad, The Early Homosexual Rights Movement 1864-1935 (Times Change Press, 1974).

Notes

External links
 Friedrich Radszuweit in German national bibliothek

1876 births
1932 deaths
German LGBT businesspeople
German gay writers
Writers from Königsberg
People from the Province of Prussia
German LGBT rights activists